"Sympathy" is a song by English rock band Uriah Heep, which was originally released on their tenth studio album Firefly in 1977. The song was written by Ken Hensley and sung by John Lawton. It was released as a single in Germany, where it peaked at No. 37. The song was recorded and mixed at Roundhouse Recording studios in London between October and November 1976, just before beginning their US tour as support of Kiss in Macon, Georgia.

The song was written in the key of D minor.

Personnel
Mick Box – guitar
Ken Hensley – keyboards
Lee Kerslake – drums
Trevor Bolder – bass guitar
John Lawton – lead vocals

References

External links

1977 singles
Uriah Heep (band) songs
Songs written by Ken Hensley
1977 songs
Bronze Records singles